William Burbridge Brown (10 September 1912, in Chillicothe, Ohio – 24 December 1985), was a lawyer who served a variety of positions in the Territory of Hawaii from 1943 to 1955, before returning to serve on the Ohio District Courts of Appeals and Ohio Supreme Court from 1960 to 1984.

William Burbridge Brown was born to Mabel R. Downs Brown and Dr. Henry Renick Brown. He attended the Chillicothe public schools, received a bachelor's degree from Williams College in 1934, and a law degree from Harvard Law School in 1937. He was admitted to the Ohio bar in 1938, and practiced that year in Toledo, before returning to Chillicothe in 1939 at the firm Simpson and Brown.

Brown left Chillicothe in 1942 to work in Washington, D.C. as a lawyer for the Office of Price Administration. He transferred to Honolulu, Hawaii in 1943, and worked for the Office of Price Administration there until 1946. In 1946, President Harry Truman appointed Brown to the Territory of Hawaii Court of Tax Appeals, and in 1947, Truman appointed him Hawaii Territory Treasurer. In 1951, the President appointed him to the Second Circuit Court for the Territory of Hawaii.

Brown returned to Chillicothe in 1955, and practiced privately for a year. In 1956, he began a four-year term as Chillicothi Municipal Court Judge. In 1960, he won a seat on the 4th District Courts of Appeals of Ohio. He was the first Democrat elected to a seat in the 4th District.

In 1972, Brown defeated incumbent Republican justice Louis J. Schneider, Jr. for a six-year term on the Ohio Supreme Court. In 1978, he won another term. In 1984, Brown was already more than seventy years old, and was prohibited by state law from running for another term. His term ended December 31, 1984.

William B. Brown married Jayne Stone on August 18, 1943. They had two children, Susan and Renny. The couple planned to travel in retirement, but William B. Brown suffered a fatal stroke as a consequence of brain cancer. His funeral was at St. Paul Episcopal Church in Chillicothe, and he was buried at Grandview Cemetery.

After Brown's death, justice J. Craig Wright said : "He was one of the best legal minds we've had on the court in the last twenty years. He was a forward-looking person. He kept the best of the past in his decisions along with the best of what we have now. I admired him."

References

1912 births
1985 deaths
Justices of the Ohio Supreme Court
Williams College alumni
Harvard Law School alumni
Politicians from Chillicothe, Ohio
Burials at Grandview Cemetery (Chillicothe, Ohio)
Judges of the Ohio District Courts of Appeals
Ohio Democrats
Territory of Hawaii judges
20th-century American judges